Alf Ihlen (30 June 1900 – 6 April 2006) was a Norwegian industrialist.

He was born in Skedsmo, as a son of engineer and politician Nils Claus Ihlen and Henriette Marie Lund. He was co-manager of the workshop Strømmens Værksted for about fifty years, along with his brother Joakim Ihlen. The two brothers developed their company into a world leading producer of aluminium based vehicles in the 1930s.

References

1900 births
2006 deaths
People from Skedsmo
20th-century Norwegian businesspeople
Norwegian centenarians
Men centenarians
Norwegian expatriates in the United States
Members of the Royal Swedish Academy of Engineering Sciences